Tietie Tuimauga (born 5 August 1993) is a Samoan rugby union player, currently playing for France’s Top 14 side, CA Brive. Previous to that Tietie was part of the Championship winning 2022 Wellington Lions squad in the Bunnings NPC competition. Other contracts include the  United Rugby Championship side Connacht in Galway, Ireland. His preferred position is prop.

Professional career
He earned his first caps for Samoa in the 2023 Rugby World Cup qualifiers against Tonga. In October 2021, he signed for Irish side .

Personal life 
Tuimauga holds a Samoan Matai Chief title of Tausivaatele from his maternal side's village of Fagafau, Savai'i.

References

External links
itsrugby.co.uk Profile

1993 births
Living people
Samoan rugby union players
Samoa international rugby union players
Connacht Rugby players
Wellington rugby union players
Manawatu rugby union players
Rugby union props